Home for Christmas is the first Christmas album by Canadian country music singer George Canyon.

Track listing

 Rudolph the Red-Nosed Reindeer (Johnny Marks) – 2:05
 Blue Christmas (Billy Hayes/Jay W. Johnson) – 4:08
 Away in a Manger (Traditional) – 3:21
 Frosty the Snowman (Walter E. "Jack" Rollins/Steve Nelson) – 3:13
 What Child Is This? (William Chatterton Dix) – 2:48
 Silent Night (Franz Gruber/Josef Mohr) – 4:18
 Santa's On His Way – 2:35

George Canyon albums
2005 Christmas albums
Christmas albums by Canadian artists
Country Christmas albums